Émile Cornic (23 December 1894 – 20 August 1964) was a French fencer. He won a silver medal in the team épée event at the 1928 Summer Olympics.

References

External links
 

1894 births
1964 deaths
French male épée fencers
Olympic fencers of France
Fencers at the 1928 Summer Olympics
Olympic silver medalists for France
Olympic medalists in fencing
People from Sucy-en-Brie
Fencers from Paris
Medalists at the 1928 Summer Olympics
Sportspeople from Val-de-Marne
20th-century French people